Pouilly-le-Monial is a former commune in the Rhône department in eastern France. On 1 January 2017, it was merged into the new commune Porte des Pierres Dorées.

See also
Communes of the Rhône department
Porte des Pierres Dorées

References

Former communes of Rhône (department)